Aytaç is a Turkish given name and surname. Ay is the Turkish word for "moon" and taç for "crown", so Aytaç can be translated as "crown of the moon" or "moon crown". People named Aytaç include:

Given name 

 Aytaç Şaşmaz (born 1998), Turkish actor
 Aytaç Ak (born 1985), Turkish footballer
 Aytaç Biter (born 1965), Turkish auto racing driver
 Aytaç Durak (born 1938), Turkish politician
 Aytaç Ercan (born 1976), Turkish Paralympian wheelchair basketballer
 Aytaç Kara (born 1993), Turkish footballer
 Aytaç Özkul (born 1989), Turkish basketball player
 Aytaç Yalman (1940–2020), Turkish general (ret.)

Surname 
 Kadri Aytaç (1931–2003), Turkish footballer
 Sakıb Aytaç (born 1991), Turkish footballer

Turkish unisex given names
Turkish-language surnames